Salla is a village in Väike-Maarja Parish, Lääne-Viru County, in northeastern Estonia. Salla is famous for its popular music festival Salla Open Air (SOA), held regularly since 2007. SOA 2013 edition's main attraction was Trio Kyrväkkäät (featuring percussion group Suonikkat Kyrväkkäät). Tikkri Pub is the most famous local inn during the festival.

References

 

Villages in Lääne-Viru County
Kreis Wierland